Adh-Dhariyat  (The Winnowing Winds) is the 51st chapter (surah) of the Qur'an with 60 verses (ayat). It mentions Abraham, Noah, and the day of judgment, and reiterates the essential Quranic message.

Structure
According to Angelika Neuwirth's literary analysis, as related through Carl Ernst, sura 51, like many early Meccan suras, consists of a tripartite structure: I, 1– 23; II, 24– 46; III, 47– 60. These three sections can be seen in a 2016 translation, The Clear Quran, which breaks the entire Quran into smaller thematic sections. The sura can be further broken down as follows:
 Rider oaths (9 verses) and end-times with double portraits (14 verses), including four thematic sections in the Clear Quran entitled, "Judgement is inevitable", "Warning to the Deniers", "Good News for the Devout", and "God's Signs in creation".
 The discourse of guests of Abraham (14 verses) and four other prophets (9 verses), including six thematic sections in the Clear Quran titled according to the prophet mentioned in the corresponding verses.
 God's creation (7 verses) and a warning (7 verses), including five thematic sections in the Clear Quran such as "God's Power of Creation" and "Warning to the Deniers".

Summary
1-6 Numerous  oaths that the judgment will come
7-11 Oaths and curses relating to unbelievers
12-16 Doom of infidels and reward of true believers
17-19 The piety and charity of Muslims
20-22 God reveals himself in his work of providence
23 Muhammad swears by the Lord that the Qurán is true
24-30 The story of Abraham's entertaining angels
31-37 Story of the destruction of Sodom
38-46 Pharaoh, Ád, Thamúd, and the people of Noah destroyed for rejecting their prophets as impostors
47-49 God reveals himself to men in his works of creation
50-51 Makkans warned to leave their idols and to fly to God
52-53 Every apostle of God called a magician or madman
54-55 Muhammad to withdraw from idolaters and yet to admonish them for the sake of true believers
56-58 Men and genii created to serve God
59-60 Woe to unbelievers who injure the apostles of God

References

External links

Dhariyat